Birds of Prey is a World Cup downhill ski course in the western United States, located at Beaver Creek Resort in Avon, Colorado. The race course made its World Cup debut  in December 1997.

Beaver Creek is a traditional early December stop on the men's World Cup calendar. The course hosted the World Championships in 1999 and 2015, and is also used for super-G and giant slalom races. Prior to 1995, the World Cup speed events in North America were usually held in the latter part of the racing season.
 
This course has hosted total of 65 men's World Cup events (eighth all-time), and an additional three speed events in March 1988 were on "Centennial", the former speed course at Beaver Creek.

In December 2021, Birds of Prey became the first course in World Cup history to host four speed events on four consecutive days (two downhills, two super-G's).

History
The Birds of Prey course was developed for the 1999 World Championships, designed by Swiss Olympic downhill champion Bernhard Russi, a noted constructor of downhill race courses around the world.

The first World Cup race was won by Kristian Ghedina of Italy in December 1997, but the course was then dominated by Austrians, led by the legendary Hermann Maier. He won three consecutive Birds of Prey downhills: the 1999 world title in front of 20,000 spectators, followed by World Cup victories in each of the next two seasons.

All rounder Lasse Kjus won record all five discipline medals at 1999 World Championships (two gold and three silver medals). This outstanding achievement has not yet been repeated.

In December 2004, Bode Miller and Daron Rahlves took first and second place, respectively, in the World Cup downhill race, the first ever one-two finish for American men in a downhill, and the first in any event in over two decades, since Phil & Steve Mahre in the 1984 Olympic slalom. The two Americans switched positions on the podium the following year.

Due to a lack of snow in France at Val d'Isère in December 2011, the women's super G was replaced on Birds of Prey course. This is the only World Cup event for ladies held here. Lindsey Vonn took the win.

Course

Sections
Downhill course sections from top (start) to the bottom (finish): The Flyaway, The Brink, The Talon, Pete's Arena, Russi's Ride, The Abyss, and The Miller's Revenge.

Jumps
The jumps of the race course adhere to the birds of prey theme: Peregrine, Goshawk, Screech Owl, Golden Eagle, Harrier, and the concluding Red Tail.

World Championships

Men's events
Only three events were held on Birds of Prey at the first championships; GS and SL were held at nearby Vail.

Women's events
Only SL was held on Birds of Prey at second championships (none of first); the other women's events were held at nearby Vail.

World Cup

Men

{|class="wikitable plainrowheaders" style="background:#fff; font-size:86%; line-height:15px; border:grey solid 1px; border-collapse:collapse;"
|+ DH – Downhill, SL – Slalom, GS – Giant Slalom, SG – Super Giant Slalom, SC – Super Combined
! style="background-color: #ccc;" width="33"|
! style="background-color: #ccc;" width="30"|Type
! style="background-color: #ccc;" width="55"|Season
! style="background-color: #ccc;" width="120"|Date
! style="background:#ccc;" width="185" |Winner
! style="background:#ccc;" width="185" |Second
! style="background:#ccc;" width="200" |Third
|-
| align=right align=center bgcolor="#EFEFEF"|1859 || align=center|SG
| bgcolor=gainsboro align=center rowspan=3|2022/23 || align=right|4 December 2022   
|  Aleksander Aamodt Kilde ||    Marco Odermatt ||  Alexis Pinturault
|-
| align=right align=center bgcolor="#EFEFEF"|1858 || align=center|DH || align=right|3 December 2022   ||  Aleksander Aamodt Kilde ||    Marco Odermatt ||  James Crawford
|-
| align=right align=center bgcolor="EDCCD5" rowspan=2| || align=center|DH || align=right|2 December 2022   || colspan=3 align=center style=color:#696969|heavy snowfall; moved to Val Gardena/Gröden on 15 December 2022
|-
| align=center|DH 
| bgcolor=gainsboro align=center rowspan=4|2021/22 || align=right bgcolor=#FFFF99|5 December 2021   
| colspan=3 align=center style=color:#696969|rescheduled downhill from Lake Louise cancelled due to strong wind|-
| align=right align=center bgcolor="#EFEFEF"|1824 || align=center|DH || align=right|4 December 2021   ||  Aleksander Aamodt Kilde ||  Matthias Mayer ||    Beat Feuz
|-
| align=right align=center bgcolor="#EFEFEF"|1823 || align=center|SG || align=right|3 December 2021   ||  Aleksander Aamodt Kilde ||    Marco Odermatt  ||  Travis Ganong
|-
| align=right align=center bgcolor="#EFEFEF"|1822 || align=center|SG || align=right|2 December 2021   ||    Marco Odermatt ||  Matthias Mayer ||  Broderick Thompson
|-
| bgcolor="EDCCD5" rowspan=3| || align=center|GS || bgcolor=gainsboro align=center rowspan=3|2020/21 || align=right|6 December 2020   
| colspan=3 rowspan=3 align=center style=color:#696969|North American Tour cancelled before the season; due to the COVID-19 pandemic|-
| align=center|DH || align=right|5 December 2020   
|-
| align=center|SG || align=right|4 December 2020   
|-
| align=right align=center bgcolor="#EFEFEF"|1753 || align=center|GS
|bgcolor=gainsboro align=center rowspan=3|2019/20 || align=right|8 December 2019  
| Tommy Ford ||  Henrik Kristoffersen ||  Leif Kristian Nestvold-Haugen
|-
| align=right align=center bgcolor="#EFEFEF"|1752 || align=center|DH || align=right|7 December 2019  
|    Beat Feuz ||  Johan Clarey  Vincent Kriechmayr || bgcolor="EDEAE0"|
|-
| align=right align=center bgcolor="#EFEFEF"|1751 || align=center|SG
| align=right|6 December 2019  
|    Marco Odermatt ||  Aleksander Aamodt Kilde ||  Matthias Mayer
|- 
| align=right align=center bgcolor="#EFEFEF"|1714 || align=center|GS
| bgcolor=gainsboro align=center rowspan=3|2018/19 ||align=right|2 December 2018  
|  Stefan Luitz ||  Marcel Hirscher ||    Thomas Tumler
|- 
| align=right align=center bgcolor="#EFEFEF"|1713 || align=center|SG
| align=right|1 December 2018  
|  Max Franz ||    Mauro Caviezel ||  Aleksander Aamodt Kilde Dominik Paris Aksel Lund Svindal
|-
| align=right align=center bgcolor="#EFEFEF"|1712 || align=center|DH 
| align=right|30 November 2018  
|    Beat Feuz ||    Mauro Caviezel ||  Aksel Lund Svindal 
|-
| align=right align=center bgcolor="#EFEFEF"|1678 || align=center|GS
|bgcolor=gainsboro align=center rowspan=3|2017/18 || align=right|3 December 2017   
| | Marcel Hirscher ||  Henrik Kristoffersen ||  Stefan Luitz
|-
| align=right align=center bgcolor="#EFEFEF"|1677 || align=center|DH
| align=right|2 December 2017   
|  Aksel Lund Svindal ||   Beat Feuz ||  Thomas Dreßen 
|-
| align=right align=center bgcolor="#EFEFEF"|1676 || align=center|SG
| align=right|1 December 2017  
|  Vincent Kriechmayr ||  Kjetil Jansrud ||  Hannes Reichelt
|-
| align=right rowspan=3 bgcolor="#EDCCD5"| || align=center|GS
|bgcolor=gainsboro align=center rowspan=3|2016/17 || align=right|4 December 2016  
| colspan=3 align=center rowspan=3 style=color:#696969|warm temperatures in November; replaced in Val d'Isère|-
| align=center|DH || align=right|3 December 2016  
|-
| align=center|SG || align=right|2 December 2016  
|-
| align=right align=center bgcolor="#EFEFEF"|1598 || align=center|GS
| bgcolor=gainsboro align=center rowspan=3|2015/16 || align=right|6 December 2015   
|  Marcel Hirscher ||  Victor Muffat-Jeandet ||  Henrik Kristoffersen
|-
| align=right align=center bgcolor="#EFEFEF"|1597 || align=center|SG
| align=right|5 December 2015   
|  Marcel Hirscher ||  Ted Ligety ||  Andrew Weibrecht
|-
| align=right align=center bgcolor="#EFEFEF"|1596 || align=center|DH || align=right|4 December 2015   
|  Aksel Lund Svindal ||  Kjetil Jansrud ||  Guillermo Fayed 
|-
| align=right align=center bgcolor="#EFEFEF"|1562 || align=center|GS 
| bgcolor=gainsboro align=center rowspan=3|2014/15 || align=right|7 December 2014  
|  Ted Ligety ||  Alexis Pinturault ||  Marcel Hirscher
|-
| align=right align=center bgcolor="#EFEFEF"|1561 || align=center|SG 
| align=right|6 December 2014   
|  Hannes Reichelt ||  Kjetil Jansrud ||  Alexis Pinturault
|-
| align=right align=center bgcolor="#EFEFEF"|1560 || align=center|DH || align=right|5 December 2014  
|  Kjetil Jansrud ||   Beat Feuz ||  Steven Nyman 
|-
| align=right align=center bgcolor="#EFEFEF"|1528 || align=center|GS 
|bgcolor=gainsboro align=center rowspan=3|2013/14 || align=right|8 December 2013  
|  Ted Ligety ||  Bode Miller ||  Marcel Hirscher
|-
| align=right align=center bgcolor="#EFEFEF"|1527 || align=center|SG 
| align=right|7 December 2013  
|    Patrick Küng ||  Otmar Striedinger ||  Peter Fill Hannes Reichelt
|-
| align=right align=center bgcolor="#EFEFEF"|1526 || align=center|DH 
| align=right|6 December 2013  
|  Aksel Lund Svindal ||  Hannes Reichelt ||  Peter Fill 
|-
| align=right align=center bgcolor="#EFEFEF"|1494 || align=center|GS 
|bgcolor=gainsboro align=center rowspan=3|2012/13 || align=right|2 December 2012  
|  Ted Ligety ||  Marcel Hirscher ||  Davide Simoncelli 
|-
| align=right align=center bgcolor="#EFEFEF"|1943 || align=center|SG 
| align=right|1 December 2012  
|  Matteo Marsaglia ||  Aksel Lund Svindal ||  Hannes Reichelt
|-
| align=right align=center bgcolor="#EFEFEF"|1492 || align=center|DH 
| align=right|30 November 2012  
|  Christof Innerhofer ||  Aksel Lund Svindal ||  Kjetil Jansrud 
|-
| align=right align=center bgcolor="#EFEFEF"|1451 || align=center|SL 
|bgcolor=gainsboro align=center rowspan=5|2011/12 || align=right bgcolor=#FFFF99|8 December 2011  
| Ivica Kostelić || Cristian Deville || Marcel Hirscher 
|-
| align=right align=center bgcolor="#EFEFEF"|1450 || align=center|GS 
| align=right bgcolor=#FFFF99|6 December 2011  
|  Ted Ligety ||  Marcel Hirscher ||  Kjetil Jansrud
|-
| align=right align=center bgcolor="#EFEFEF"|1449 || align=center|GS 
| align=right|4 December 2011  
|  Marcel Hirscher ||  Ted Ligety ||  Fritz Dopfer 
|-
| align=right align=center bgcolor="#EFEFEF"|1448 || align=center|SG
| align=right|3 December 2011  
|    Sandro Viletta ||  Aksel Lund Svindal ||    Beat Feuz
|-
| align=right align=center bgcolor="#EFEFEF"|1447 || align=center|DH 
| align=right|2 December 2011  
|  Bode Miller ||    Beat Feuz ||  Klaus Kröll 
|-
| align=right align=center bgcolor="#EFEFEF"|1412 || align=center|GS
|bgcolor=gainsboro align=center rowspan=3|2010/11 || align=right|5 December 2010  
|  Ted Ligety ||  Kjetil Jansrud ||  Marcel Hirscher
|-
| align=right align=center bgcolor="#EFEFEF"|1411 || align=center|SG
| align=right|4 December 2010  
|  Georg Streitberger ||  Adrien Théaux ||    Didier Cuche 
|-
| align=right align=center bgcolor="#EDCCD5"|  || align=center|DH 
| align=right|3 December 2010  
| colspan=3 align=center style=color:#696969|strong winds; replaced in Kvitfjell on 11 March 2011|- 
| align=right align=center bgcolor="#EFEFEF"|1380 || align=center|GS
|bgcolor=gainsboro align=center rowspan=3|2009/10 || align=right|6 December 2009  ||   Carlo Janka ||  Benjamin Raich ||  Aksel Lund Svindal
|- 
| align=right align=center bgcolor="#EFEFEF"|1379 || align=center|DH 
| align=right|5 December 2009  
|    Carlo Janka ||    Didier Cuche ||  Aksel Lund Svindal
|- 
| align=right align=center bgcolor="#EFEFEF"|1378 || align=center|SC
| align=right|4 December 2009  
|    Carlo Janka ||    Didier Défago ||  Natko Zrnčić-Dim 
|- 
| align=right align=center bgcolor="#EFEFEF"|1344 || align=center|GS 
|bgcolor=gainsboro align=center rowspan=4|2008/09 || align=right|6 December 2008  
|  Benjamin Raich ||  Ted Ligety ||  Aksel Lund Svindal
|- 
| align=right align=center bgcolor="#EFEFEF"|1443 || align=center|SG 
| align=right|5 December 2008  
|  Aksel Lund Svindal ||  Hermann Maier ||  Michael Walchhofer
|- 
| align=right align=center bgcolor="#EFEFEF"|1442 || align=center|DH 
| align=right|5 December 2008  
|  Aksel Lund Svindal ||  Marco Buechel ||  Erik Guay
|- 
| align=right align=center bgcolor="#EDCCD5"|  || align=center|SC 
| align=right|4 December 2008  
| colspan=4 align=center style=color:#696969|heavy snowfall; replaced in Val d'Isère on 12 December 2008|-
| align=right align=center bgcolor="#EFEFEF"|1305 || align=center|SG
|bgcolor=gainsboro align=center rowspan=4|2007/08 || align=right|3 December 2007   
|  Hannes Reichelt ||  Mario Scheiber ||  Christoph Gruber
|-
| align=right align=center bgcolor="#EFEFEF"|1304 || align=center|GS
| align=right|2 December 2007   
|    Daniel Albrecht ||  Mario Matt ||    Didier Cuche
|-
| align=right align=center bgcolor="#EFEFEF"|1303 || align=center|DH
| align=right|30 November 2007   
|  Michael Walchhofer ||  Steven Nyman ||    Didier Cuche
|-
| align=right align=center bgcolor="#EFEFEF"|1302 || align=center|SC
| align=right|29 November 2007   
|    Daniel Albrecht ||  Jean-Baptiste Grange ||  Ondřej Bank
|-
| align=right align=center bgcolor="#EFEFEF"|1268 || align=center|SL
| bgcolor=gainsboro align=center rowspan=4|2006/07 || align=right|3 December 2006  
|  André Myhrer ||  Michael Janyk ||  Felix Neureuther
|-
| align=right align=center bgcolor="#EFEFEF"|1267 || align=center|GS
| align=right|2 December 2006  
|  Massimiliano Blardone ||  Aksel Lund Svindal ||  Ted Ligety
|-
| align=right align=center bgcolor="#EFEFEF"|1266 || align=center|DH 
| align=right|1 December 2006  
|  Bode Miller ||   Didier Cuche ||  Steven Nyman 
|-
| align=right align=center bgcolor="#EFEFEF"|1265 || align=center|SC 
| align=right|30 November 2006  
|  Aksel Lund Svindal ||   Marc Berthod ||  Rainer Schönfelder
|-
| align=right align=center bgcolor="#EFEFEF"|1231 || align=center|SL
|bgcolor=gainsboro align=center rowspan=4|2005/06 || align=right|4 December 2005  
|  Giorgio Rocca ||  Stéphane Tissot ||  Ted Ligety
|-
| align=right align=center bgcolor="#EFEFEF"|1230 || align=center|SG 
| align=right|3 December 2005  
|  Bode Miller ||  Daron Rahlves ||  Kalle Palander
|-
| align=right align=center bgcolor="#EFEFEF"|1229 || align=center|DH 
| align=right|2 December 2005  
|  Daron Rahlves ||  Bode Miller ||  Hans Grugger 
|-
| align=right align=center bgcolor="#EFEFEF"|1228 || align=center|SG 
| align=right|1 December 2005  
|  Hannes Reichelt ||  Erik Guay ||  Matthias Lanzinger 
|-
| align=right align=center bgcolor="#EFEFEF"|1195 || align=center|SL
|bgcolor=gainsboro align=center rowspan=4|2004/05 || align=right|5 December 2004  
|  Benjamin Raich ||  Giorgio Rocca ||  Rainer Schönfelder
|-
| align=right align=center bgcolor="#EFEFEF"|1194 || align=center|GS
| align=right|4 December 2004  
|  Lasse Kjus ||  Hermann Maier ||  Benjamin Raich
|-
| align=right align=center bgcolor="#EFEFEF"|1193 || align=center|DH 
| align=right|3 December 2004  
|  Bode Miller ||  Daron Rahlves ||  Michael Walchhofer 
|-
| align=right align=center bgcolor="#EFEFEF"|1192 || align=center|SG 
| align=right|2 December 2004  
|  Stephan Görgl ||  Bode Miller ||  Mario Scheiber
|-
| align=right align=center bgcolor="#EFEFEF"|1157 || align=center|SG 
|bgcolor=gainsboro align=center rowspan=3|2003/04 || align=right|7 December 2003  
|  Bjarne Solbakken ||  Hermann Maier ||  Hans Knauß
|-
| align=right align=center bgcolor="#EFEFEF"|1156 || align=center|DH 
| align=right|6 December 2003  
|  Hermann Maier ||  Hans Knauß ||  Andreas Schifferer
|-
| align=right align=center bgcolor="#EFEFEF"|1155 || align=center|DH 
| align=right|5 December 2003  
|  Daron Rahlves ||  Stephan Eberharter Bjarne Solbakken || bgcolor="EDEAE0"|
|-
| align=right align=center bgcolor="#EFEFEF"|1119 || align=center|SG
|bgcolor=gainsboro align=center rowspan=2|2002/03 || align=right|8 December 2002  
|    Didier Cuche ||  Marco Büchel ||  Hannes Trinkl
|-
| align=right align=center bgcolor="#EFEFEF"|1118 || align=center|DH 
| align=right|7 December 2002  
|  Stephan Eberharter ||  Michael Walchhofer ||  Daron Rahlves  
|-
| align=right rowspan=2 bgcolor="#EDCCD5"| || align=center|SG
|bgcolor=gainsboro align=center rowspan=2|2001/02 || align=right|2 December 2001  
| colspan=3 align=center style=color:#696969|replaced in Val d'Isère on 7 December 2001|-
| align=center|DH || align=right|1 December 2001  
| colspan=3 align=center style=color:#696969|replaced in Bormio on 28 December 2001|-
| align=right align=center bgcolor="#EFEFEF"|1051 || align=center|SG 
|bgcolor=gainsboro align=center rowspan=2|2000/01 || align=right|3 December 2000  
|  Fredrik Nyberg ||  Christoph Gruber ||  Kenneth Sivertsen
|-
| align=right align=center bgcolor="#EFEFEF"|1050 || align=center|DH 
| align=right|2 December 2000  
|  Hermann Maier ||  Lasse Kjus ||  Stephan Eberharter  
|-
| align=right align=center bgcolor="#EFEFEF"|1009 || align=center|SG 
|bgcolor=gainsboro align=center rowspan=2|1999/00 || align=right|28 November 1999  
|  Hermann Maier ||  Stephan Eberharter ||  Lasse Kjus
|-
| align=right align=center bgcolor="#EFEFEF"|1008 || align=center|DH 
| align=right|27 November 1999  
|  Hermann Maier ||  Stephan Eberharter ||  Kristian Ghedina 
|-
| align=right align=center bgcolor="#EFEFEF"|939 || align=center|SG 
|bgcolor=gainsboro align=center rowspan=3|1997/98 || align=right|5 December 1997  
|  Hermann Maier ||  Stephan Eberharter ||  Hans Knauß
|-
| align=right align=center bgcolor="#EFEFEF"|938 || align=center|DH 
| align=right|5 December 1997  
|  Andreas Schifferer ||  Hermann Maier ||  Stephan Eberharter 
|-
| align=right align=center bgcolor="#EFEFEF"|937 || align=center|DH
|align=right|4 December 1997   ||  Kristian Ghedina ||  Jean-Luc Crétier ||  Lasse Kjus 
|}

Women

Raptor
Adjacent to Birds of Prey on Beaver Creek Mountain, a new women's downhill course was built for the 2015 World Championships. Named Raptor, it hosted three women's World Cup events in November 2013 as a test.

Video
You Tube.com - The Birds of Prey Downhill - From Jalbert Production's The Thin Line'' 
You Tube.com - Hans Knauss - Audi Birds of Prey POV Downhill - December 2010

References

External links
 Slope profile
 
 2015 World Championships venues – October 2013
 FIS-ski.com - Podium finishers at Beaver Creek 

Ski areas and resorts in Colorado
Vail Resorts
Tourist attractions in Eagle County, Colorado